The Sam and Shirley Strauss House is a historic house at 4 Sunset Drive in Cammack Village, Arkansas.  It is a single story structure built out of a combination of brick and wood, with a broad shallow-pitch sloping roof. The roof extends on the east side to cover an open carport.  At one point in the roof there is a gap, originally made for a tree standing on the property at the time of the house's construction. The exterior is clad in vertical redwood siding, with a variety of window configurations.  The house, designed by Little Rock architect Noland Blass, Jr., and built in 1963–64, is an excellent regional example of Mid-Century Modern architecture.

The house was listed on the National Register of Historic Places in 2015.

See also
National Register of Historic Places listings in Pulaski County, Arkansas

References

Houses on the National Register of Historic Places in Arkansas
Houses completed in 1964
Houses in Pulaski County, Arkansas